Carl Zeiss SMT GmbH comprises the Semiconductor Manufacturing Technology business group of ZEISS and develops and produces equipment for the manufacture of microchips. The company is majority owned by Carl Zeiss AG, with a 24.9% minority stake by ASML Holding.

The headquarters of the group are located in Oberkochen, Germany, with additional  sites in the German cities Jena, Wetzlar, Rossdorf, Dublin (USA), Peabody (USA) and Bar Lev (Israel). As of September 2021, the total workforce in the seven sites is approximately 5,200.

History 

In 1968, ZEISS supplied the optics for a circuit printer for the first time. About nine years later, the world's first predecessor to a modern wafer stepper, produced by David Mann (later GCA), was equipped with optics from Carl Zeiss.
In 1983, the first lithography optics from ZEISS were used in a wafer stepper from Philips. Just under ten years later, ZEISS and Philips carve-out company ASML entered into a strategic partnership.
The Semiconductor Manufacturing Technology business group was established by ZEISS in 1994. Carl Zeiss SMT GmbH and its subsidiaries Carl Zeiss Laser Optics GmbH and Carl Zeiss SMS GmbH followed in 2001. The construction of the Semiconductor Manufacturing Technology plant of ZEISS in Oberkochen started the same year, and was completed in 2006. In 2010, the semiconductor area achieved revenues of over a billion euros for the first time. Effective October 2014, the subsidiaries Carl Zeiss Laser Optics and Carl Zeiss SMS GmbH were merged into Carl Zeiss SMT GmbH.

Product areas

Semiconductor manufacturing optics
The ZEISS business group develops and produces optics for semiconductor production. Its core business is lithography optics that form the centerpiece of a wafer scanner. The development and manufacture of projection optics and the development of illumination systems take place at the Oberkochen site, while the production of most types of illumination system is located in Wetzlar. In addition to lithography optics, the business group is specialized in numerous other optical products, including optical components for lasers that are used as light sources for lithographic systems.

Photomask systems
This area develops and manufactures systems that analyze and repair defects on photomasks and measure and optimize defined mask properties. The photomask contains all the structure information that will be imaged on the wafer with light.

References

Further reading 
Carl Zeiss is a top supplier of critical subsystems, in: WaferNEWS, July 7/2003, pp. 4

External links 
 ZEISS Website
 Carl Zeiss Foundation 
 Carl Zeiss SMT

Carl Zeiss AG
Semiconductor companies of Germany